Mount Pleasant is a ghost town in Atchison County, Kansas, United States.

History
The first settlement at Mount Pleasant was made in 1854. A post office called Mount Pleasant was in operation from 1855 until 1900.

References

Further reading

External links
 Atchison County maps: Current, Historic, KDOT

Geography of Atchison County, Kansas
Ghost towns in Kansas
1854 establishments in Kansas Territory